"Mama Mia" was a single of an Italian artist In-Grid. It was released in 2005.

A Spanish-English version of the song was also released.

Song information
This song is about a love life of In-grid. Her love is to small for a moment that In-grid became his girl. He had said to her, tell or he'll go and has what time she re-examine him and all the time it was Mrs. thing the same stories without thinking.

Lyrics
The lyrics were written by In-Grid and Marco Soncini, who co-produced the song with Alfredo Larry Pignagnoli. The English version was also co-written by Daniela Galli (also known as Dhany) and Paul Sears.

Charts

Weekly charts

Year-end charts

References

External links
    Lyrics of Spanglish Version
   official site of in-grid

2005 singles
In-Grid songs
Italian-language songs
2005 songs
Songs written by Dhany